Antonio Chavez Trejo (born May 20, 1981) is a Mexican filmmaker, writer, producer and entrepreneur. His films are noted for their surreal feel, dark undertones and sense of humor, visually appealing cinematography and have been featured in many film festivals internationally including Cannes Film Festival and Glendale Film Festival.

Life and career 
Antonio was born and raised in Mexico City. In 2005, he received his bachelor's degree in Science of Communication from the Universidad Anahuac del Sur where he met his screenwriting mentor The Palme d'Or winner and Oscars-nominated writer and producer Guillermo Arriaga with whom he still has a great friendship. He also possesses an associate degree from Spanish Radio TV - RTVE in Screenwriting and as a Television Anchorman and a master's degree from the New York Film Academy as a Master of Fine Arts in Filmmaking.

In 2014, his dark comedy short film Killer Tango was world premiered at Cannes Film Festival. In 2015, Antonio's short action/drama «Bloody Luck» premiered at Cannes Film Festival and in 2016, it got 6 nominations and won Best Short Film at WIND International Film Festival. It was also an official selection at the HBO's Urban Action Show Case International Action Film Festival in New York, where it was nominated for Best Short Film.

Shortly thereafter, Antonio wrote and directed a dystopian post-apocalyptic short drama «MIRA Protocol». The film premiered at Glendale Film Festival nominated as «Best Short Film» and Antonio won a «Best filmmaker in Burbank» award and got the recognition from the Legislature of the State of California in 2017 as such.

In 2018, Antonio announced that he is working on a project called «Howlers» and creating a unique scriptwriting narrating structure which allows to follow multiply story lines at the same time. The project combines together three elements: 360 degree environment, traditional filmmaking and immersive theatre.

References 

Living people
1981 births
Mexican film producers
Mexican surrealist artists
English-language film directors
Film directors from Mexico City
Writers from Mexico City
20th-century Mexican male writers
21st-century Mexican male writers
Surrealist filmmakers
New York Film Academy alumni
Universidad Anáhuac México alumni